The Japanese settlers in Manchuria were the Japanese immigrants who came to Manchuria after the Russo-Japanese War and settled in zones of Japanese interests (mostly in larger cities).

After the Japanese occupation (1931) and establishment of Manchukuo, huge crowds of Japanese agricultural pioneers settled in Manchuria. The first wave of the migration was a five-year trial emigration plan. Many had been young, land-poor farmers in Japan that were recruited by the Patriotic Youth Brigade to colonize new settlements in Manchukuo. The Manchukuo government had seized great portions of these land through "price manipulation, coerced sales and forced evictions". Some Japanese settlers gained so much land that they could not farm it themselves and had to hire Chinese or Korean laborers for help, or even lease some of it back to its former Chinese owners, leading to uneasy, sometimes hostile relations between the groups. These mass migration programs continued until the end of World War II. By 1945, more than a million Japanese lived in Manchuria.

On August 10th, 1945, one day after the Soviet Union declared war on Japan, the Japanese Army evacuated many families of officers and soldiers. On the retreat from Manchuria, bridges were destroyed and telegraph lines were cut. As many Japanese settlers became stranded in Manchuria, mass suicides were rampant.

See also
Japanese repatriation from Huludao

Notes

Literature 
 Louise Young, “Colonizing Manchuria, The Making of an Imperial Myth”, in Stephen Vlastos (ed.), Mirror of Modernity, Invented Traditions of Modern Japan, University of California Press, Berkeley, 1998, pp. 95–109.
 Ronald Suleski, “Northeast China Under Japanese Control, The Role of the Manchurian Youth Corps., 1934-1945”,Modern China, Vol. 7, No. 1, 1981, pp. 351–377.

External links 

War crimes in Manchukuo
Japanese war crimes
Japanese people from Manchukuo
People of Manchukuo
Japanese emigrants to China
Settlement schemes in the Empire of Japan
Settlers